This Is Regina! is the sixth studio album by American singer Regina Belle. It was released by Peak Records on October 23, 2001 in the United States. Her debut with the label, following her departure from Columbia Records and a short stint with MCA Records, Belle retamed with Barry J. Eastmond, producer on her second album, Stay with Me (1989), to work on the majority of This Is Regina!. Upon release, the album peaked at number 61 on the US Top R&B/Hip-Hop Albums and number 26 on the Independent Albums. Only single, "Oooh Boy," peaked at number 68 on the Hot R&B/Hip-Hop Songs and number 64 on the Hot R&B/Hip-Hop Airplay.

Critical reception

Allmusic editor Jose F. Promis found that "This Is Regina follows in the traditional Regina Belle formula: lush, sophisticated quiet storm ballads, augmented by Belle's strong, warm, elegant, inviting vocals. The album steers clear of anything too adventurous, which is just fine, because Belle's fans have come to love her for her reliability as an old friend who returns every few years with a fresh set of new, yet familiar songs [...] In short, save for a few left turns, this adequately titled album is pure Regina Belle and will undoubtedly please the sophisticated songstress' many fans."

Track listing

Charts

References

2001 albums
Regina Belle albums